The Hammett Prize is awarded annually by the International Association of Crime Writers, North American Branch (IACW/NA) to a Canadian or US citizen or permanent resident for a book in English in the field of crime writing. It is named after crime-writer Dashiell Hammett and was established in 1991.

Past winners

 1991 - Maximum Bob by Elmore Leonard (Delcorte)
 1992 - Turtle Moon by Alice Hoffman (Putnam)
 1993 - The Mexican Tree Duck by James Crumley (Mysterious Press)
 1994 - Dixie City Jam by James Lee Burke (Hyperion)
 1994 - Under the Beetle's Cellar by Mary Willis Walker (Doubleday)
 1996 - Rose by Martin Cruz Smith (Random House)
 1997 - Trial of Passion by William Deverell (McClelland & Stewart)
 1998 - Tidewater Blood by William Hoffman (Algonquin)
 1999 - Havana Bay by Martin Cruz Smith (Random House)
 2000 - The Blind Assassin by Margaret Atwood (Doubleday/McClelland & Stewart)
 2001 - Kingdom of Shadows by Alan Furst (Random House)
 2002 - Honor's Kingdom by Owen Parry (Morrow)
 2003 - The Seduction of Water by Carol Goodman (Ballantine)
 2004 - Prince of Thieves: A Novel  by Chuck Hogan (Scribner)
 2005 - Alibi: A Novel by Joseph Kanon (Henry Holt)
 2006 - The Prisoner of Guantánamo by Dan Fesperman (Knopf)
 2007 - The Outlander by Gil Adamson (House of Anansi)
 2008 - The Turnaround by George Pelecanos (Little, Brown)
 2009 - The Manual of Detection by Jedediah Berry (The Penguin Press)
 2010 - The Nearest Exit  by  Olen Steinhauer (St. Martin's/Minoutar)
 2011 - The Killer is Dying by James Sallis (Walker and Company)
 2012 - Oregon Hill by Howard Owen (Permanent)
 2013 - Angel Baby: A Novel by Richard Lange (Mulholland)
 2014 - Mr. Mercedes by Stephen King (Scribner)
 2015 - The Do-Right by Lisa Sandlin (Cinco Puntos Press)
 2016 - The White Devil by Domenic Stansberry (Molotov Editions)
 2017 - August Snow by Stephen Mack Jones (Soho Crime)
 2018 - November Road by Lou Berney (Morrow)
 2019 - Bluff by Jane Stanton Hitchcock (Poison Pen)
 2020 - When These Mountains Burn by David Joy (Putnam)
 2021 - Razorblade Tears by S. A. Cosby (Flatiron)

References

External links
Award guidelines
Past Winners (including nominees)

Mystery and detective fiction awards
Awards established in 1991
1991 establishments in the United States